Maodo Malick Mbaye (born 6 November 1995) is a Senegalese footballer who plays as a midfielder for Italian  club Viterbese.

Club career
Mbaye began his career on Trento's youth categories, after departing from Africa in December 2011. After making his first-team debut in the last game of the season, he joined Serie A side Chievo.

On 4 December 2013 Mbaye made his professional debut, starting in a 4-1 home routing over Reggina Calcio, for the campaign's Coppa Italia. On 13 January of the following year he made his top flight debut, coming on as a late substitute in a 1–1 draw at Inter Milan.

On 13 August 2014, Mbaye joined Serie B side Carpi on a season long loan. Mbaye made his debut as a substitute in Carpi's 1-1 draw against Livorno on 30 August 2014.

Mbaye returned to Carpi on another loan in July 2016. The loan was renewed on 11 August 2017 and again renewed on 2 August 2018.

On 31 January 2019 he moved on loan to Cremonese.

On 23 January 2021, he signed with Matelica.

On 25 August 2021 he joined Fermana.

On 11 August 2022, Mbaye moved to Viterbese.

Honours

Carpi F.C.
 Serie B: 2014–15

Chievo Primavera
Campionato Nazionale Primavera: 2013-2014

References

External links

1995 births
Living people
Sportspeople from Thiès
Senegalese footballers
Association football midfielders
Serie A players
Serie B players
Serie C players
Serie D players
A.C. ChievoVerona players
A.C. Trento 1921 players
A.C. Carpi players
Latina Calcio 1932 players
U.S. Cremonese players
Novara F.C. players
S.S. Matelica Calcio 1921 players
Fermana F.C. players
U.S. Viterbese 1908 players
Senegalese expatriate footballers
Senegalese expatriate sportspeople in Italy
Expatriate footballers in Italy